Ghoreishi (adjective form of "Quraysh") – also occurring in the transliteration variants Ghorashi, Qorayshi or Quraishi – is an Iranian language surname. It is the romanization from the Persian language of the Muslim family name Qureshi and may refer to:

 Ali Akbar Ghoreishi (born 1928), Iranian Shiite cleric
 Farrokh Ghoreishi (born 1951), retired Iranian-born English footballer 
 Haleh Ghoreishi (born 1962), Iranian-born anthropologist who lives in the Netherlands
 Mehdi Ghoreishi (born 1990), Iranian footballer
 Setayesh Ghoreishi (born 2010), Afghan murder victim 
 Seyed Mehdi Ghoreishi (born 19??), Iranian Shiite cleric

See also 
 List of people with surname Qureshi

References 

Persian-language surnames